Weed is a surname. It may refer to:

People
 Abner Weed, American politician and Civil War soldier, namesake of Weed, California
 Alfred Cleveland Weed  (1881-1953), American ichthyologist
 Bobby Weed (born 1955), American golf course designer and builder
 Charles Leander Weed (1824-1903), American photographer
 George S. Weed (1862-1919), American lawyer and politician
 Gideon A. Weed (1833-1905), mayor of Seattle and doctor
 Henry I. Weed (1861-1945), Wisconsin state senator and lawyer
 LeRoy J. Weed (1878–1961), New York assemblyman
 Robert Law Weed (1897–1961), American architect
 Stephen H. Weed (1831–1863), U.S. Army general in the American Civil War
 Tad Weed (1933–2006), placekicker for the 1954 Ohio State Buckeyes football team
 Thurlow Weed (1797–1882), New York political boss

Fictional characters
 Colonel Weed, a character in Gunga Din
 Jonathan Weed, Peter Griffin's boss in the animated TV series Family Guy